Monogenic may refer to:

 Monogenic signal, in the  theory of analytic signals
 Monogenic disorder, disease, inheritance, or trait, a single gene disorder resulting from a single mutated gene
 Monogenic diabetes, or maturity-onset diabetes of the young (MODY), forms of diabetes caused by mutations in an autosomal dominant gene
 Monogenic field, in mathematics, an algebraic number field K
 Monogenic function, a function in an algebra over a field
 Monogenic polynomial, an alternate name for monic polynomial
 Monogenic semigroup, in mathematics, a semigroup generated by a set containing only a single element
 Monogenic system, in classical mechanics, a physical system

See also
 Monogenous (disambiguation)
 Monogenetic (disambiguation)
 Monogenism (disambiguation)